Cupuladriidae is a family of bryozoans belonging to the order Cheilostomatida.

Genera:
 Biselenaria Gregory, 1893
 Cupuladria Canu & Bassler, 1919
 Discoporella d'Orbigny, 1852
 Reussirella Baluk & Radwanski, 1984
 Vibracellina Canu & Bassler, 1917

References

Cheilostomatida